Nancy A. Murphy is a New Hampshire politician. She has been a member of the NH House of Representatives for one term. In April 2021 Murphy won a seat on the Merrimack town council.

Education
Murphy earned a B.S. in nursing from Boston University.

Professional career
On November 6, 2018, Murphy was elected to the New Hampshire House of Representatives where she represents the Hillsborough 21 district. Murphy assumed office on December 5, 2018. Murphy is a Democrat. Murphy endorsed Bernie Sanders in the 2020 Democratic Party presidential primaries.

Personal life
Murphy resides in Merrimack, New Hampshire. Murphy is married and has six children.

References

Living people
Women state legislators in New Hampshire
Boston University alumni
People from Merrimack, New Hampshire
Democratic Party members of the New Hampshire House of Representatives
21st-century American women politicians
21st-century American politicians
Year of birth missing (living people)